The Delta Cryogenic Second Stage (DCSS) is a family of cryogenic rocket stages used on the Delta III and Delta IV rockets, and on the Space Launch System Block 1. The stage consists of a cylindrical liquid hydrogen (LH2) tank structurally separated from an oblate spheroid liquid oxygen (LOX) tank.  The LH2 tank cylinder carries payload launch loads, while the LOX tank and engine are suspended below within the rocket's inter-stage.  The stage is powered by a single Aerojet Rocketdyne-Pratt & Whitney RL10B-2 engine, which features an extendable carbon-carbon nozzle to improve specific impulse.

Delta III
The DCSS first flew on 3 Delta IIIs, failing two out of two times. A booster failed on the maiden flight and the rocket was destroyed by range safety, causing the loss of the DCSS before ignition. On its second flight, the stage tumbled uncontrollably, inserting the payload into a useless orbit. On the third flight, the stage performed the planned burn but fell short of the target orbit due to premature propellant exhaustion. The flight was deemed a failure. An un-flown example is on display outside the Discovery Cube Orange County.

Delta IV
Two different versions are flown, depending on variant.  Composite interstages used to mate the first and second stages together accommodate the different configurations. 
For the Delta IV-M, a tapering interstage that narrows down in diameter from 5 meters to 4 meters is used on the 4-meter DCSS, while a cylindrical interstage is used on the 5-meter DCSS (for Delta IV Heavy). 

Since the retirement of the Delta IV-M and Delta IV-M+ rockets, the DCSS is now used solely on the Delta IV Heavy in its 5-meter variation. , two missions remain before ULA retires the Delta IV Heavy.

Interim Cryogenic Propulsion Stage
The Interim Cryogenic Propulsion Stage, a minimally modified 5-meter DCSS, is used as the upper stage of the Space Launch System Block 1. The ICPS for Artemis I was mated to the SLS launch stack on July 6, 2021. The ICPS will be used for the first three Artemis missions before being retired in favor of the in-development Exploration Upper Stage for Artemis 4.

References

Cryogenic Second Stage
Space Launch System
United Launch Alliance
Rocket engines using hydrogen propellant
Rocket stages
Boeing spacecraft and space launch systems